Keumhee Carrière Chough (also published as Keumhee Chough Carrière) is a Korean-Canadian statistician whose theoretical contributions include work on repeated measures design; she is co-editor of Analysis of Mixed Data: Methods & Application, and has also contributed to highly-cited works on public health. She is a professor of mathematical and statistical sciences at the University of Alberta.

Education and career
After graduating from Seoul National University in 1979 and earning a master's degree at the University of Manitoba in 1985, Chough went to the University of Wisconsin–Madison for doctoral study, earning a second master's degree in 1987 and completing her Ph.D. in 1989. Her dissertation, Statistical Issues for Repeated Measures Data in the Presence of Treatment Effects, was supervised by Gregory C. Reinsel.

She became an assistant professor and director of the statistical consulting center at the University of Iowa in 1990, moving to the University of Manitoba in 1993 and the University of Alberta in 1996. At the University of Alberta, she has directed the Training Consulting Centre and the Biostatistics Research Group since 1999. She was named full professor in 2000, and became head of the Statistics Division in the Department of Mathematical and Statistical Sciences in 2013.

Recognition
Chough was president of the Biostatistics Section of the Statistical Society of Canada for 2002–2003. She was named a Fellow of the American Statistical Association in 2009.

References

External links
Home page

Year of birth missing (living people)
Living people
Canadian statisticians
Women statisticians
Seoul National University alumni
University of Manitoba alumni
University of Wisconsin–Madison alumni
University of Iowa faculty
Academic staff of the University of Manitoba
Academic staff of the University of Alberta
Fellows of the American Statistical Association